Bizhou is a town of Xinlin District the south-central part of Da Hinggan Ling Prefecture, Heilongjiang province, China, located  south of the prefectural seat. , it has one residential community under its administration.

See also
List of township-level divisions of Heilongjiang

References

Township-level divisions of Heilongjiang